Widden is a locality in New South Wales, Australia, in the Muswellbrook Shire.  It is located on the Bylong Valley Way. The Sandy Hollow- Gulgong goods railway line passes through the locality.

See also
 Bylong
 Sandy Hollow
 Denman

Suburbs of Muswellbrook Shire